"Lovestruck" is a song by English ska band Madness, released as the lead single from their seventh studio album, Wonderful (1999), on 19 July 1999. This release marked the first time Madness had put out original material for over 10 years and signified their return to music. "Lovestruck" peaked at number 10 on the UK Singles Chart, which was the first time a new Madness release had reached the top 10 since the 1983 release "The Sun and the Rain". The song also charted in Iceland, reaching number 36 on the Íslenski Listinn Topp 40.

Track listings
"Maddley" is a medley of songs from Madness's then upcoming album, Wonderful ("If I Didn't Care" / "Drip Fed Fred" / "Elysium" / "Johnny the Horse" / "The Wizard" / "4 AM" / "Going to the Top" / "You're Wonderful")

UK CD1
 "Lovestruck" 
 "We Are Love" 
 "Lovestruck" (enhanced video)

UK CD2 and cassette single
 "Lovestruck" 
 "Round And Round" 
 "Maddley" 

European CD single
 "Lovestruck" 
 "Maddley"

Charts

References

External links
 

Madness (band) songs
1999 singles
1999 songs
Songs written by Lee Thompson (saxophonist)
Songs written by Mike Barson
Song recordings produced by Clive Langer
Song recordings produced by Alan Winstanley
Virgin Records singles